The Fisheries Act 1985 is a Malaysian federal act relating to the administration and management of fisheries, including the conservation and development of maritime and estuarine fishing and fisheries in Malaysia waters, protection to aquatic mammals and turtles and riverine fishing in Malaysia and to matters connected to establishment of marine parks and marine reserves.

The Director-General of Fisheries is the management authority and has absolute powers in making conditions for permits related to fishery resources.

Even though the Director-General has official authority, much of the local fishing industry are under the control of aquaculture gangs, and the act itself has sparked gang violence in many areas regarding the gang's control of fishing "turf".

Preamble
WHEREAS it is expedient to consolidate and amend the written law relating to fisheries, including the conservation, management and development of maritime and estuarine fishing and fisheries, in Malaysian fisheries waters and to turtles and riverine fishing in Malaysia;
AND WHEREAS by Clause (1) of Article 74 of the Federal Constitution Parliament may make laws with respect to any of the matters enumerated in the Federal List or the Concurrent List, and whereas fisheries, including maritime and estuarine fishing and fisheries (excluding turtles), is a matter enumerated in the Federal List under item 9 of List I of the Ninth Schedule to the Federal Constitution and maritime and estuarine fishing and fisheries are also matters enumerated in the Concurrent List under item 12 of List IIIA of the said Ninth Schedule in respect of the States of Sabah and Sarawak;
AND WHEREAS by Clause (1)(b) of Article 76 of the Federal Constitution Parliament may make laws with respect to any matter enumerated in the State List for the purpose of promoting uniformity of the laws of two or more States, and whereas turtles and riverine fishing are matters enumerated in the State List under item 12 of List II of the Ninth Schedule of the Federal Constitution

Structure
The Fisheries Act 1985, in its current form (1 November 2012), consists of 11 Parts containing 62 sections and no schedule (including 2 amendments).
 Part I: Preliminary
 Part II: Administration
 Part III: Fisheries Plans
 Part IV: General Licensing Provisions
 Part V: Foreign Fishing Vessels
 Part VI: Offences
 Part VII: Turtles and Inland Fisheries
 Part VIII: Aquaculture
 Part IX: Marine Parks and Marine Reserves
 Part X: Enforcement
 Part XI: General Provisions

See also
Fisheries Act

External links
 Fisheries Act 1985  

1985 in Malaysian law
Malaysian federal legislation
Nature conservation in Malaysia
Fishing in Malaysia